Platydoris scabra is a species of sea slug, a dorid nudibranch, shell-less marine opisthobranch gastropod mollusks in the family Discodorididae.

Distribution
This species was described from Timor. It is reported widely in the tropical Indo-Pacific Ocean.

References

External links 
 

Discodorididae
Gastropods described in 1804